is one of the 100 Famous Japanese Mountains, reaching the height of . It is situated in Japan's Hida Mountains in Gifu Prefecture and in Chūbu-Sangaku National Park. The shape of the mountain looks like the Umbrella("Kasa"-笠) in the triangle. Therefore, it became this name. There are many mountains with same name in Japan and this is the tallest.

History 
 In 1683 – It was said that Enkū had opened this mountain.
 In 1894, August 2  – Englishman Walter Weston had climbed on the top.
 In 1913, August – Usui Kojima had climbed on the top.
 In 1932 – Mountain hut of Kasa Mountain Cottage  (笠ヶ岳山荘) was constructed near the top.
 In 1934, December 4 – This area was  specified to the Chūbu-Sangaku National Park.
 In 1964 – "Kasa-shin-dō"(笠新道) of the new Trail had been made. Then it is the main route to the Mount Kasa.
 In 1993 – Postage stamp of Mount Kasa and Takayama Festival was put on the market by the Ministry of Posts and Telecommunications (Japan).
 In 1995 – Sumie Tanaka (田中澄江 Tanaka Sumie) completed New Flowers of the 100 Mountains, which featured many of the Alpine plant(Trollius japonicus シナノキンバイ and others) on Mount Kasa.

Mountaineering

Main ascent routes 
 
There are three climbing routes to the top of the mountain. 
 
Kasa-shin-dō
Shin-Hotaka Onsen(新穂高温泉) – Mount Nukedo – Kasa Mountain Cottage – Mount Kasa
Valley Kuriya
Nakao-Kōgen-guchi(中尾高原口) – Valley Kuriya – Mount Kasa
Traverses Route of Northern Japanese Alps(Hida Mountains) from north side
Mount Sugoroku – Mount Yumiori – Mount Nukedo – Kasa Mountain Cottage – Mount Kasa

Mountain hut 
Thera are several Mountain hut around Mount Kasa.
Around Shin-Hotaka-Onsen, there are many hot spring (Onsen) to take the tiredness and to relax. 
 Kasa Mountain Cottage  (笠ヶ岳山荘) – near the top (with Campsite)
 Wasabi-Daira Hut (ワサビ平小屋) – near the entrance of Kasa-shin-dō
 Kagami-Daira Mountain Cottage  (鏡平山荘) – near the Pond Kagami(鏡池)
 Sugoroku Hut (双六小屋) – between Mount Sugoroku and Mount Momisawa (with Campsite)

Geography 

It is the mountain that consists chiefly of the Porphyry (geology). The higher region than Shakushi-daira(杓子平) are the forest limit of Siberian Dwarf Pine belt, and the place that Alpine plant grows naturally and Rock Ptarmigan live.

Nearby mountains 
Mount Kasa is on the subridge (from Mount Sugoroku) of the main ridge line in the southern part of the Hida Mountains.　There are Mount Shakujō and Mount Ōkibanotsuji on the southern ridge.

Rivers 
The mountain is the source of the following rivers, each of which flows to the Sea of Japan.
 Sugoroku River (a tributary of the Jinzū River)
 Gamata River (tributaries of the Takahara River)

Gallery

References

See also
 Hida Mountains
 Chūbu-Sangaku National Park
 List of mountains in Japan
 100 Famous Japanese Mountains

Hida Mountains
Japan Alps
Chūbu-Sangaku National Park
Mountains of Gifu Prefecture